Zenda (1999–2019) was a thoroughbred racehorse. She won the Poule d'Essai des Pouliches at Longchamp Racecourse in France in 2002. She was the dam of Kingman and a half-sister to the leading sprinter and stallion Oasis Dream, and is closely related to Beat Hollow and the Irish Oaks winner Wemyss Bight. She was euthanized due to laminitis on 17 May 2019 at the age of 20.

References

1999 racehorse births
2019 racehorse deaths
Thoroughbred family 19
Racehorses bred in the United Kingdom
Racehorses trained in the United Kingdom